Jeffrey Adam Driskel (born April 23, 1993) is an American football quarterback for the Houston Texans of the National Football League (NFL). He played college football at Florida, before transferring to Louisiana Tech, and was drafted by the San Francisco 49ers in the sixth round of the 2016 NFL Draft.

Waived by the 49ers, he joined the Cincinnati Bengals, where he was the third string quarterback. He began the 2018 season as backup to Andy Dalton, and following an injury to Dalton, he started the last five games of the season. He then went on to be the backup for the Detroit Lions and Denver Broncos, in which he started three games with the Lions and one for the Broncos. In 2021, Driskel signed for the Texans, and he converted from quarterback to tight end, but ultimately went back to quarterback for the 2022 season.

Early years
Driskel attended Paul J. Hagerty High School in Oviedo, Florida, where he played high school football and basketball. During his high school career, he threw for 4,844 yards and 36 touchdowns. In 2010, Driskel was selected as a member of the Elite 11 quarterback competition, finishing first among quarterbacks and awarded MVP. As a senior in 2010, he was the Maxwell Football Club National High School Player of the Year and the Gatorade Florida Player of the Year. He was ranked as the best pro-style quarterback recruit in his class by Rivals.com and Scout.com.

College career

Florida
Driskel accepted an athletic scholarship to attend the University of Florida, where he played for coach Will Muschamp's Florida Gators football team. As a freshman, Driskel appeared in five games, completing 16 of 34 passes for 148 yards with two interceptions. He became the team's starter as a sophomore in 2012. He led them to an 11–2 record and a berth in the 2013 Sugar Bowl, in which Florida lost to the Louisville Cardinals.

After starting three games in 2013, Driskel broke his right fibula in a game against Tennessee and missed the remainder of the season. He returned from the injury in 2014 and kept his starting job to start the season but was later benched in favor of Treon Harris.

Louisiana Tech
On January 3, 2015, Driskel was granted a release from Florida and he transferred to Louisiana Tech University. In his lone season at Louisiana Tech, he passed for 4,026 yards with 27 touchdowns.

College statistics

Baseball
Despite not playing baseball since high school, Driskel was selected by the Boston Red Sox with the 863rd pick of the 2013 Major League Baseball Draft. Driskel signed a contract, but he had no plans to stop playing football.

Professional career

San Francisco 49ers
Driskel was selected by the San Francisco 49ers in the sixth round of the 2016 NFL Draft with the 207th overall pick. The 49ers previously traded tight end Vernon Davis to the Denver Broncos in exchange for the pick used to select Driskel. On May 5, 2016, the 49ers signed him to a four-year, $2.45 million contract with a signing bonus of $112,539.  Driskel began training camp as the No. 4 quarterback on the depth chart. After a season-ending injury to Thad Lewis, Driskel competed with Christian Ponder for the third-string quarterback position. On September 3, 2016, he was waived by the 49ers.

Cincinnati Bengals
Driskel was claimed off waivers by the Cincinnati Bengals on September 4, 2016. He began the season as the Bengals' third quarterback on their depth chart behind veterans Andy Dalton and A. J. McCarron.

On September 4, 2017, Driskel was placed on injured reserve.

Driskel made his regular-season NFL debut on October 21, 2018, in relief of Andy Dalton in the fourth quarter in the final minutes of a 45–10 loss to the Kansas City Chiefs, completing all four of his pass attempts for 39 yards. In Week 12, against the Cleveland Browns, Dalton was injured and out for the season with a thumb injury. Driskel came into the game in relief and threw his first professional touchdown to Tyler Boyd. He added a late rushing touchdown in the 35–20 loss. He started the last five games of the season for the Bengals. He went 1–4 and passed for 764 yards, five touchdowns, and two interceptions in the five starts.

Driskel was placed on injured reserve on August 31, 2019. He was waived from injured reserve with an injury settlement on September 11.

Detroit Lions

On September 17, 2019, Driskel was signed by the Detroit Lions. On November 10, 2019, Driskel made his first start for the Lions against the Chicago Bears after Matthew Stafford was inactive due to injury. He finished the Week 10 contest with 269 passing yards, one touchdown, and one interception as the Lions lost 20–13. In Week 11 against the Dallas Cowboys, Driskel threw for 209 yards and two touchdowns and rushed for 51 yards and a touchdown in the 35–27 loss. After suffering a hamstring injury during a loss to the Washington Redskins, Driskel was placed on injured reserve on November 30, 2019.

Denver Broncos
On March 27, 2020, Driskel signed a two-year contract with the Denver Broncos. On September 20, 2020, Driskel came in for injured starting quarterback Drew Lock in a Week 2 matchup against the Pittsburgh Steelers. He passed for 256 yards, two touchdowns, and one interception in relief in the 26–21 loss. Driskel made his first start as a Bronco in Week 3 against the Tampa Bay Buccaneers. During the game, Driskel threw for 176 yards, 1 touchdown, and 1 interception before being benched in the fourth quarter of the 28–10 loss. On November 26, 2020, Driskel was placed on the reserve/COVID-19 list after testing positive for the virus. He and the other three quarterbacks on the Broncos roster were fined by the team for violating COVID-19 protocols. Driskel was activated from the COVID-19 list on December 16, 2020. On May 3, 2021, Driskel was released by the Broncos.

Houston Texans
On May 20, 2021, Driskel signed a one-year contract with the Houston Texans. He was released on August 31, 2021. He was signed to the practice squad the following day. He was promoted to the active roster on October 16, 2021. On November 18, Driskel converted from quarterback to tight end, playing the position for the first time in his career. He was placed on injured reserve on December 22.

On March 18, 2022, Driskel re-signed with the Texans. He was released on August 30, 2022, and signed to the practice squad the next day. He was promoted to the active roster on December 14.

NFL career statistics

References

External links

Houston Texans bio
 Florida Gators bio

1993 births
Living people
People from Oviedo, Florida
Sportspeople from Seminole County, Florida
Players of American football from Florida
American football quarterbacks
American football tight ends
Florida Gators football players
Louisiana Tech Bulldogs football players
San Francisco 49ers players
Cincinnati Bengals players
Detroit Lions players
Denver Broncos players
Houston Texans players
Ed Block Courage Award recipients